Komm doch mal rüber was Nadine's debut album, released on May 25, 2007. The album peaked to number 4 on the Austrian Albums Chart.

Music style
The sound of the songs varies throughout the entire album, although all songs are in German. The first single of the album was "Alles was du willst" and the 2nd single from the album was "Was wir sind".

Her songs are very emotional and rather slow, though there are some Hip hop and Contemporary R&B songs, influenced by some of her favorite interpreters like Mariah Carey, Céline Dion and Beyoncé.

Singles
 "Alles was du willst" was the first single released from the album. It was released on February 16, 2007. The single peaked to number 2 on the Austrian Singles Chart.
 "Was wir sind" was the second and final single from the album. It was released on May 4, 2007. The single peaked to number 15 on the Austrian Singles Chart.

Track listing

Charts

References

2007 debut albums
German-language albums
Nadine Beiler albums